A Gallicism can be:
 a mode of speech peculiar to the French;
 a French idiom;
 in general, a French mode or custom.
 a loanword, word or phrase borrowed from French.

See also
 Francization
 Franglais
 Gallic (disambiguation)
 Gallican Rite, an ancient church rite
 Gallicanism, a religious-political philosophy from France
 List of English words of French origin
 List of French phrases used by English speakers

French language
Types of words
Word coinage
Transliteration